Murray Selig Miller (born December 2, 1976) is an American television writer and producer. Miller has produced and written for many television programs, including King of the Hill, American Dad!, Girls, 7 Days in Hell (2015) and Tour de Pharmacy (2017).

Early life and career
Miller was born to a Jewish family, the son of Gary and Zoe Miller. He has one sister, Geneva Wasserman, and one brother, writer and producer Judah Miller, who is married to Marissa Jaret Winokur. Miller is a graduate of Monte Vista High School in Danville, California, and attended New York University where he was roommates with Andy Samberg.

Miller started his career as a stand-up comedian in New York City.

Personal life
On March 19, 2016, Miller married writer Crystal Meers.

Allegation of rape
On November 17, 2017, actress Aurora Perrineau (daughter of actor Harold Perrineau) filed a police report with the Los Angeles County Sheriff's Department alleging Miller, then age 35, had raped her in 2012 when she was age 17. Miller has denied the accusation. On August 10, 2018, the Los Angeles County District Attorney's Office after an investigation in response to the police report of Perrineau formally declined to file charges against Miller by reason of the statute of limitations for prosecution of statutory rape had passed, and further declined prosecution for rape on any other grounds due to "inconsistencies which cannot be overcome" and the delay in reporting the case.

Filmography

Television

Awards and nominations

References

External links
 

1976 births
Living people
Jewish American writers
Tisch School of the Arts alumni
American television producers
Jewish American television producers